The Presbyterian Church in Korea (HapDongSeongHoe) came into existence out of a desire to maintain the unity of the Presbyterian Church in Korea (BoSuHapDong). But a number of concerned pastors formed this denomination in 1987. They want to "gather the members in a holy meeting". The denomination subscribes the Apostles Creed and the Westminster Confession. In 2004 it had 10,013 members in 78 congregations and 64 ordained ministers in 5 Presbyteries.

References 

Presbyterian denominations in South Korea
Presbyterian denominations in Asia